Venezuela competed at the 2016 Summer Paralympics in Rio de Janeiro, Brazil, from 7 to 18 September 2016.

Medalists

| width=78% align=left valign=top |

| width="22%" align="left" valign="top" |

Disability classifications

Every participant at the Paralympics has their disability grouped into one of five disability categories; amputation, the condition may be congenital or sustained through injury or illness; cerebral palsy; wheelchair athletes, there is often overlap between this and other categories; visual impairment, including blindness; Les autres, any physical disability that does not fall strictly under one of the other categories, for example dwarfism or multiple sclerosis. Each Paralympic sport then has its own classifications, dependent upon the specific physical demands of competition. Events are given a code, made of numbers and letters, describing the type of event and classification of the athletes competing. Some sports, such as athletics, divide athletes by both the category and severity of their disabilities, other sports, for example swimming, group competitors from different categories together, the only separation being based on the severity of the disability.

Athletics

Men

Women

Cycling 

With one pathway for qualification being one highest ranked NPCs on the UCI Para-Cycling male and female Nations Ranking Lists on 31 December 2014, Venezuela qualified for the 2016 Summer Paralympics in Rio, assuming they continued to meet all other eligibility requirements.

Men

Road

Judo

Men

Women

Powerlifting

Swimming

Men

Women

Table tennis

Men

See also
Venezuela at the 2016 Summer Olympics

References

Nations at the 2016 Summer Paralympics
2016
2016 in Venezuelan sport